Dominic Walsh Dance Theater (DWDT) is a contemporary dance company based in Houston Texas. Started by artistic director and former principal dancer for the Houston Ballet, Dominic Walsh, DWDT ranges from progressive to classical choreography.

Dominic Walsh joined the Houston Ballet in 1989, rising to Principal Dancer in 1996. In 1998, he created Flames of Eros when Ben Stevenson invited him to choreograph on Houston Ballet, his work winning him the Choo San Goh Award for Choreography. In 2002, he formed Dominic Walsh Dance Theater.  In 2004, the company received the title of one of the top "25 to Watch" by Dance Magazine.

Dancers
The dancers for 2011–2012 season are:

 Domenico Luciano
 Stefania Figliossi
 Hana Sakai

 Emily McLaughlin
 Matthew Prescott
 Kathryn Thomas

 Antonio Carmena
 Carl Coomer

 Robert Dekkers
 Ashley Lynn Gilfix

References

External links
 Dominic Walsh Dance Theater

Dance companies in the United States
Performing groups established in 2002
2002 establishments in Texas
Dance in Texas
Non-profit organizations based in Houston